TRCNG (Hangul: 티알씨엔지; an acronym for Teen Rising Champion in a New Generation) was a South Korean boy band formed by TS Entertainment in 2017. They debuted with the EP New Generation on October 10, 2017.

Originally a ten-piece group, Wooyeop and Taeseon left the group in November 2019 and filed suit against TS Entertainment for violations of child welfare legislation, alleging abuse, assault, and extortion. They, in turn, were sued by the parents of the remaining members for spreading false information. The group disbanded on March 28, 2022.

History

2017–2018: Debut, further releases and Japanese debut
On August 17, 2017, TS Entertainment announced that they would debut their second boy group in the latter half of 2017, the first since B.A.P.

On October 10, 2017, TRCNG released their first EP titled New Generation along with the music video for title track "Spectrum". Members Jisung and Hohyeon participated in the rap-writing themselves. A Japanese version of "Don't Stop the Dancing" was included and they debuted in Japan on November 22, 2017.

On January 2, 2018, TRCNG release the single album Who Am I along with the music video for the lead single "Wolf Baby". TRCNG released the Japanese single "Game Changer" on July 25. In September 2018, they launched the mobile app TRCNG Mobile. Designed for the group to communicate with fans, it was made available on Android and iOS.

2019–2022: Rising, members lawsuits, TS shutdown, and disbandment
On May 17, 2019, TRCNG released the single "Paradise".

On November 4, Wooyeop and Taeseon filed a criminal complaint against TS Entertainment with the Seoul Metropolitan Police Agency for violating the Child Welfare Law, citing child abuse, assault, and money extortion. They filed a request to cancel their contracts with the company. It resulted in their departure from the group. The pair later disclosed evidence of their abuse, claims which TS denied. On November 27, the parents of the remaining TRCNG members filed a lawsuit against Wooyeop, Taeseon, and their parents, alleging that they were spreading false information and intentionally causing conflicts.

In January 2021, TRCNG's label, TS Entertainment, privately shut down and deleted its website, leaving the fate of the group unknown.

On March 28, 2022, TS Entertainment announced that TRCNG's contract has ended, and the group has officially disbanded after 3 years.

Members
 Jihun (지훈)
 Hayoung (하영)
 Taeseon (태선) — leader
 Hakmin (학민)
 Wooyeop (우엽)
 Jisung (지성)
 Hyunwoo (현우)
 Siwoo (시우)
 Hohyeon (호현)
 Kangmin (강민)

Discography

Extended plays

Single albums

Singles

References

K-pop music groups
Musical groups established in 2017
South Korean boy bands
South Korean dance music groups
South Korean pop music groups
Musical groups from Seoul
2017 establishments in South Korea
TS Entertainment artists
Musical groups disestablished in 2022
2022 disestablishments in South Korea